David Clerson (born 1978 in Sherbrooke, Quebec) is a Canadian novelist from Quebec, who won the Grand Prix littéraire Archambault in 2014 for his debut novel Frères. Brothers, the novel's English translation by Katia Grubisic, was published in November 2016 and was a shortlisted finalist for the Governor General's Award for French to English translation at the 2017 Governor General's Awards.

His second novel, En rampant, was published in 2016.

His third book, Dormir sans tête was published in 2019 and was a shortlisted finalist for the Grand Prix du livre de Montréal. This short story collection is translated by Katia Grubisic under the title Too See Out The Night.

References

1978 births
21st-century Canadian novelists
Canadian male novelists
Canadian novelists in French
Writers from Sherbrooke
French Quebecers
Living people
21st-century Canadian male writers